The Musical Sancho Panza is a two-act 2005 Spanish musical which premiered in Madrid to coincide with the 400th anniversary of the publication of Don Quixote. by Miguel de Cervantes. The play is a humorously presented look at the social landscape of the 16th and 17th centuries, including the customs, beliefs, professions, and trades of the era, while updating those points of the play by displaying it in the looks and forms of the 21st century.

Opening at the Teatro Nuevo Apolo, the play's music and original lyrics were created by José Luis Narom. Narom collaborated with his wife, lyricist and costume designer Inma González (Image designer and production manager on "The Blackout"). The play's music was created in the style of Broadway musicals, with full orchestrations.

2005 production 
The starring roles included the role of Dulcinea, played by the singer and actress Geno Machado. Actor and singer Gonzalo Alcaín played the role of Galeote. The role of Rocinante was played by Esteban Oliver, who later played Zazu in The Lion King on Broadway  and played the same role in Madrid between 2011 and 2014.

The premiere was attended by entertainers such as Chenoa, Nuria Fergó, and Natalia.

The Musical Sancho Panza received awards in the category of Best Music in a Spanish Musical, for José Luis Narom in the X Review Awards Musical Theatre in Spain.

Cast album 
The producer recorded a live album of the musical with the original cast.

The musical was included in the book Don Quixote literary theoretical thinking,. as well as in the Musical Theatre Guide in Spain (1955–2012). edited by Xavier Martínez and Íñigo Santamaría.

Aspects of the show

Musical numbers 

Act One
 "Intro" – Musical introduction.
 "La suerte ha cambiado" – list of all the characters. They sing and dance.
 "Los Molinos" – all women sing and Sancho Panza, Don Quixote while it is turned by windmills.
 "Sabio Frestón" – The ghost of Don Quixote torments him flying across the stage.
 "Dulcinea y Quijote" – Don Quixote imagines that he and Dulcinea declare their love for each other.
 "Los Galeotes" – scene in which Don Quixote and Sancho Panza free the prisoners Galeotes.
 "Alabanzas" – The choir, Don Quixote and Sancho Panza to Don Quixote sing praises.
 End of first Act

Act Two

 Intermission
 "Rocinante y Mula" – The horses sing and dance a fun theme, while their masters sleep.
 "Sancho y Teresa" – Sancho misses his wife Teresa. Along with Sancho's mule sing, three, the most romantic ballad musical.
 "Dulcinea y Sancho" – Dulcinea comes in dreams to console Don Quixote, after his defeat with the Knight of the White Moon; and even Sancho listening and see.
 "Teresa, the Housekeeper and Niece" – The housekeeper and niece of Don Quixote, with Teresa, miss men. Trio of women who sing and dance.
 "Dame tu amor" – Don Quixote is sick and everyone says goodbye. They sing and dance in his honor. It is the final musical number.
 "Final"

Madrid original cast 

 Geno Machado (Dulcinea)
 Angel Savín (Sancho Panza)
 Luz Martinez (Dapple)
 Manuel Elias (Don Quixote)
 Esteban Oliver (Rocinante)
 Azucena Ribas (Teresa)
 Lourdes Zamalloa (Housekeeper)
 Eva Manjon (Niece)
 Carlos Segui (Priest)
 Pedro Ordóñez (Duke)
 Marta Arroyo (Duchess)
 Marcos Valiente (Butler)
 José Manuel Santos (Frestón Wise)
 Quique Fernández (Knight of the White Moon)
 Gonzalo Alcaín (Galeote)
 Nuria Zamora (Villager)

Technical details 
 Original music and arrangements: José Luis Narom
 Direction of voices: Eduardo Laguillo
 Choreographic direction: Alberto Sánchez Diezma
 Guion and songs lyrics: Inma González and José Luis Narom
 Scenery Design: J. Carlos Guerra
 Lighting Design: Lola Barroso
 Costume Design: Inma González
 Stage direction: José Luis Narom

References

TV and press interventions 
 El Mundo Newspaper reference
 El Mundo Newspaper Homage to Don Quixote
 El Mundo Newspaper people reference
 El País Ionesco and Cervantes – Musical Sancho Panza
 Newspaper 20 Minutos (page 23 to 13 April 2005)
 Newspaper 20 Minutos
 Reference in Studia Humanitatis Musicales
 Theatre in Miami – reference
 Reference in Lukor – Europa Press
 Musical Theatre Guide in Spain
 Clippings references
 Europa Press – Vilaweb Newspaper reference
 New Apolo Theatre – The Musical Sancho Panza
 Albacenter 400th anniversary reference
 Reference in Teatro Musical Expresión
 La República de Perú Newspaper photo reference
 Caleta video – The Musical Sancho Panza
 kitschote references
 Assaig General reference
 The Musical Sancho Panza – Chenoa Interview TVM

External links 
 Official site of the producer
 Official site of the composer
 Clippings references Sancho Panza, the musical (2005)

2005 musicals
Works based on Don Quixote
Spanish musicals